Roots is an American television miniseries based on Alex Haley's 1976 novel Roots: The Saga of an American Family. The series first aired on ABC in January 1977. Roots received 37 Primetime Emmy Award nominations and won nine. It also won a Golden Globe and a Peabody Award. It received unprecedented Nielsen ratings for the finale, which holds the record as the third-highest-rated episode for any type of television series, and the second-most-watched overall series finale in U.S. television history. It was produced on a budget of $6.6 million.

A sequel, Roots: The Next Generations, first aired in 1979, and a second sequel, Roots: The Gift, a Christmas television film, starring Burton and Louis Gossett Jr., first aired in 1988. A related film, Alex Haley's Queen, is based on the life of Queen Jackson Haley, who was Alex Haley's paternal grandmother.

In 2016, a remake of the original miniseries, with the same name, was commissioned by the History channel and screened by the channel on Memorial Day.

Plot

Colonial times
In the Gambia, West Africa, in 1750, Kunta Kinte is born to Omoro Kinte (Thalmus Rasulala), a Mandinka warrior, and his wife, Binta (Cicely Tyson). He is raised in a Muslim family. When Kunta (LeVar Burton) reaches the age of 15, he and other boys undergo a semi-secretive tribal rite of passage, under the kintango (Moses Gunn), which includes wrestling, circumcision, philosophy, war-craft and hunting skills; while tasked to catch a bird unharmed, Kunta crosses paths with Gardner's small party of European slave hunters and their captives.

Shortly after his ceremonial return, while fetching wood outside his village to make a drum for his younger brother, Kunta is captured by Gardner and four black collaborators. He is then sold to a slave trader and placed aboard the slave ship Lord Ligonier under the command of Capt. Thomas Davies (Edward Asner) for a three-month journey to Colonial America. During the voyage, Kunta bonds with a Mandinka wrestler (Ji-Tu Cumbuka) who was part of his manhood training, as well as a Mandinka girl named Fanta whom he met shortly before his kidnapping. An insurrection among the human cargo fails to take over the ship, but results in the death of the cruel overseer Mr. Slater (Ralph Waite), several crew members and several Africans, including the wrestler.

The ship eventually arrives in Annapolis, Maryland, in 1767, where the captured Africans are sold at auction as slaves. John Reynolds (Lorne Greene), a plantation owner from Spotsylvania County, Virginia, near Fredericksburg, buys Kunta and gives him the Christian name Toby. Reynolds assigns an older slave, Fiddler (Louis Gossett Jr.), to teach Kunta English and train him in the ways of servitude. Although Kunta gradually warms up to Fiddler, he wants to preserve his Mandinka (and Islamic) heritage, and he defiantly refuses to eat pork or accept his Christian name.

Kunta makes several unsuccessful attempts to escape, first breaking his leg chain with a broken tool blade he finds half buried in a field. After this attempt the overseer, Ames (Vic Morrow), gathers the slaves and directs another slave to whip Kunta until he acknowledges his new name "Toby". Fiddler comforts the bloody-backed Kunta and uses his Mandinka name for the first time, assuring him "there will be another day". For events that occur in 1775, between the above period and the post-Revolutionary War, where the next section begins, see Roots: The Gift.

Late 18th century

In 1776, the adult Kunta Kinte (John Amos), still haunted by his Mandinka roots and desire for freedom, tries again to escape. He makes it to a nearby plantation where his boyhood friend Fanta is enslaved, although he discovers after spending the night with her that she has turned away from her African name and heritage in the name of survival. A pair of slave-catchers track him there and hobble him by chopping off almost half his right foot with a hatchet. Exasperated, John Reynolds decides to sell Kunta, which will also settle a debt with his brother Dr. William Reynolds (Robert Reed), the local physician. John transfers several of his slaves, including Fiddler, to William.

Bell (Madge Sinclair), the cook for William's family, successfully treats both Kunta's mangled foot and wounded spirit. A trusted member of the Reynolds household, she arranges for Kunta to become Dr. Reynolds's driver. Eventually Kunta submits to a life of servitude, although he never entirely renounces Africa (declaring to Bell, "I ain't never gonna be no Christian man...I ain't never gonna eat no pig meat"), nor his hope of returning there. He marries Bell, in a ceremony which includes jumping across a broom, although his talk of Africa frustrates her. Bell bears a daughter in 1790, to whom Kunta gives the name Kizzy, which means "stay put" in the Mandinka language (in hopes of ensuring that she will never be sold away). Fiddler continues to mentor Kunta, and dies an old man shortly after Kizzy's birth.

Turn of the 19th century
An adulterous relationship between Dr. William Reynolds and John Reynolds's wife (Lynda Day George) produces a daughter, Missy Anne (Sandy Duncan), whom John believes is his own. Missy Anne and Kizzy become playmates and best friends despite the social confines of Southern plantation culture. Missy Anne secretly teaches Kizzy to read and write, a skill forbidden to human chattel. In 1806, Kizzy (Leslie Uggams), falls in love with Noah (Lawrence Hilton-Jacobs), a spirited slave who attempts to flee North with a "traveling pass" forged by Kizzy from a pass given to her by Missy Anne.

Dr. Reynolds, although amiable and compassionate toward his chattel, regards the pass and escape to be such an egregious breach of trust that he separately sells both Noah and Kizzy, much to the horror of Bell and Kunta. Missy Anne, who had offered Kizzy a place as her companion and maid, instead renounces their friendship and watches dispassionately as Kizzy is dragged away. Tom Moore (Chuck Connors), a planter in Caswell County, North Carolina, with a sexual appetite for young female slaves, becomes Kizzy's new owner, and violently rapes her the night of her arrival. Kizzy becomes pregnant from the assault and gives birth to their son, George, nine months after her arrival.

Early 19th century
In 1824, an adult Kizzy is wooed by Sam Bennett (Richard Roundtree), a fancy carriage driver whose master is visiting the Moores. Seeking to impress Kizzy, he takes her for a short visit to her former home on Dr. Reynolds's plantation, in the hope that she can see her parents. Kizzy learns that Bell has been sold away and that Kunta died two years earlier. Kizzy sees her father's grave and his wooden marker; using a small stone, she scratches over the name Toby and writes below it "Kunta Kinte," and promises him that his descendants will be free one day.

The cheerful and confident George (Ben Vereen), under the tutelage of an older slave named Mingo (Scatman Crothers), learns much about cockfighting. By direction of Moore, George takes over as the chief trainer, the "cock of the walk." George befriends Marcellus, a free black man, and fellow cockfighter, who informs him about the possibility of buying his own freedom. At the same time, he believes Moore to be a close friend. However, in 1831 (not 1841 as erroneously listed in the TV captions), George realizes his master's true feelings when he and his family are threatened at gunpoint by Moore and his wife, as a result of the Nat Turner rebellion. Although none of Moore's slaves are personally involved in the rebellion, they become victims of the paranoid suspicions of their master, so they start planning to buy their freedom, although Moore tells George he will never allow it. In an emotional scene, Kizzy finally tells George that Moore is his father.

George becomes an expert in cockfighting, thus earning for himself the moniker "Chicken George." Squire James (Macdonald Carey), Moore's main adversary in the pit, arranges for a British owner, Sir Eric Russell (Ian McShane), and twenty of his cocks to visit and to participate in the local fights. Moore eventually bets a huge sum on his best bird, which George has trained, but he loses, and he cannot pay.

Under the terms of a settlement between Moore and Russell, George goes to England to train cocks for Russell and to train more trainers and is forced to leave behind Kizzy (his mother), Tildy (Matilda, his wife) (Olivia Cole) and his sons, Tom and Lewis (Georg Stanford Brown and Hilly Hicks). Moore promises to set George free on the latter's return and to keep the family together in his absence. However, a now-broke Moore then sells all of his remaining slaves except Kizzy.

In one brief scene, Kizzy and Missy Anne Reynolds, both elderly, meet by chance one last time. Missy Anne denies that she "recollects" a "darkie by the name of Kizzy." Kizzy then spits into Missy Anne's cup of water without Missy Anne's realizing it.

The Civil War
George returns in 1861, shortly before the start of the Civil War. He proudly announces that Moore, after some reluctance on Moore's part and some persuasion on George's part, has kept his word by granting George his freedom. He learns that Kizzy has died two months before, and that Tildy, Tom and Lewis now belong to Sam Harvey (Richard McKenzie). Tom (Georg Stanford Brown) has become a blacksmith on the Harvey plantation and has a wife, Irene (Lynne Moody), and two sons.

George is welcomed warmly and learns that his relatives have spoken well of him during his absence. He further learns that according to a law in North Carolina, if he stays 60 days in that state as a freed slave, he will lose his freedom, so he heads northward, seeking the next stage in his career as a cockfighter and awaiting the end of the war, the emancipation of the slaves, and another reunion of his family.

While the war continues to its inevitable end, a hungry and destitute young white couple from South Carolina, George and Martha Johnson (Brad Davis and Lane Binkley), arrive and ask for help, and the slave family take them in. George Johnson is given a job as overseer of the plantation, but has no experience with slaves and balks at the expectation that he mistreat them. Martha soon gives birth, but the child is stillborn. The white couple stays on with Tom and his wife, becoming a part of their community. Tom Harvey meets harassment at the hands of two brothers, Evan and Jemmy Brent (Lloyd Bridges and Doug McClure).

Eventually, a month before the surrender by the South, Jemmy deserts the Confederate Army during the final desperate days of the war, and he shows up at Tom's blacksmith shop. Tom reluctantly runs an errand for him but, on returning, he finds Jemmy trying to rape Irene, and in the resulting fight Tom drowns him in the quenching tub. Later Evan, now an officer in the Confederate cavalry, arrives at the shop, demands to know about Jemmy, gets no answer, and angrily tells Tom that he has not yet finished with him.

After the war several local white men, led by Evan Brent and wearing white hoods (made from fabric sacks from Evan's store) begin to harass and terrorize Tom, his family, and other members of his community. Tom emerges as the leader among his group, while tensions arise between the white Johnsons and Tom's brother Lewis. As the local blacksmith, Tom devises a horseshoeing method to identify the horses involved in the raids by the hooded men. But when Tom reports his suspicions and his evidence to the sheriff (John Quade), who is in sympathy with Evan and knows every member of the white mob, the sheriff tips off Evan.

Meanwhile, the former owner of the farm, Sam Harvey, is forced to surrender all of his property to Senator Arthur Justin (Burl Ives), a local politician intent on acquiring as much land as possible. Under the terms of the surrender, his former slaves are allowed to stay on as sharecroppers, with eventual rights to own a part of the land. However, because no written deed has been filed, the senator deems the agreement void and imposes heavy debts on the black farmers as a legal pretext to keep them from leaving the county. He gives oversight of the farm to Evan, who reinstates George Johnson as overseer, believing whites should not farm alongside blacks otherwise.

Evan's mob leads another raid against Tom, during which Tom is whipped savagely. George Johnson intervenes and is forced to whip Tom, to his own horror and disgust, in order to save his friend's life. Lewis emotionally reconciles with the Johnsons as the family treats Tom's injuries, unsure of their future.

Postwar
On the night Tom was whipped, George unexpectedly returns, raises the spirits of his relatives and friends, and begins to plot their next step. He reports that he has bought some land in Tennessee. Using some cunning and deception of their own, the black farmers make preparations for their move away. The group eventually lures Evan and his gang to the farm and overpowers them, jubilantly departing for Tennessee as they watch helplessly. In the last scene George and his group arrive on his land in Henning, Lauderdale County, Tennessee, to start their new life.

George retells part of the story from Kunta Kinte in Africa to himself in Tennessee. Then Alex Haley briefly narrates a montage of photographs of family members connecting Tom's daughter, Cynthia, a great-great-granddaughter of Kunta Kinte, to Haley himself. For the continuation of the story from the late 19th century into the 20th century, see Roots: The Next Generations.

Cast
Number in parentheses indicates how many episodes in which the actor/character appears.

 LeVar Burton – Young Kunta Kinte (2)
 Olivia Cole – Matilda (3)
 Louis Gossett Jr. – Fiddler (3)
 Ben Vereen – Chicken George Moore (3)
 Vic Morrow – Ames (2)
 John Amos – Older Kunta Kinte (3)
 Ji-Tu Cumbuka – Wrestler (2)
 Edward Asner – Capt. Davies (2)
 Lynda Day George – Mrs. Reynolds (3)
 Robert Reed – Dr. William Reynolds (4)
 Madge Sinclair – Bell Reynolds (3)
 Chuck Connors – Tom Moore (2)
 Sandy Duncan – Missy Anne Reynolds (2)
 Leslie Uggams – Kizzy Reynolds (2)
 Carolyn Jones – Mrs. Moore (2)
 Lloyd Bridges – Evan Brent (2)
 Georg Stanford Brown – Tom Harvey (2)
 Brad Davis – Ol' George Johnson (2)
 Lane Binkley – Martha Johnson (2)
 Hilly Hicks – Lewis (2)
 Lynne Moody – Irene Harvey (2)
 Austin Stoker – Virgil (2)
 Ralph Waite – Third mate Slater (2)
 Cicely Tyson – Binta (1)
 Thalmus Rasulala – Omoro (1)
 Moses Gunn – Kintango (1)
 Hari Rhodes – Brima Cesay (1)
 Ren Woods – Fanta (2)
 Ernest Lee Thomas – Kailuba (1)
 Lorne Greene – John Reynolds (2)
 Scatman Crothers – Mingo (1)
 George Hamilton – Stephen Bennett (1)
 Lillian Randolph – Sister Sara (1)
 Roxie Roker – Malizy (1)
 Richard Roundtree – Sam Bennett (1)
 Thayer David – Harlan (2)
 Tanya Boyd – Genelva (2)
 John Quade – Sheriff Biggs (1)
 Maya Angelou – Nyo Boto (1)
 O.J. Simpson – Kadi Touray (1)
 Beverly Todd – Older Fanta (1)
 Paul Shenar – John Carrington (1)
 Gary Collins – Grill (1)
 Richard Farnsworth – Trumbull (1)
 Raymond St. Jacques – Drummer (1)
 Lawrence Hilton-Jacobs – Noah (1)
 John Schuck – Ordell (1)
 Macdonald Carey – Squire James (1)
 Ian McShane – Sir Eric Russell (1)
 Doug McClure – Jemmy Brent (1)
 Burl Ives – Sen. Arthur Justin (1)
 Richard McKenzie – Sam Harvey (2)
 Sally Kemp – Lila Harvey (2)
 William C. Watson – Gardner (1)
 Charles Cyphers – Drake (1)
 Macon McCalman – Poston (1)
 Brion James – Slaver (1)
 Tracey Gold – Young Missy Reynolds (1)
 Todd Bridges – Bud (1)
 Ross Chapman – Sergeant Williams (1)
 Grand L. Bush – Captured runaway slave (1)

Production
The miniseries was directed by Marvin J. Chomsky, John Erman, David Greene and Gilbert Moses. It was produced by Stan Margulies. David L. Wolper was executive producer. The score was composed by Gerald Fried, and Quincy Jones for only the first episode. Many familiar white TV actors, such as Ed Asner (from The Mary Tyler Moore Show), Chuck Connors (The Rifleman), Lorne Greene (Bonanza and later Battlestar Galactica), Robert Reed (The Brady Bunch), and Ralph Waite (The Waltons), were cast against type as slave holders and traders. ABC television executives "got cold feet" after seeing the brutality depicted in the series and attempted to cut the network's predicted losses by airing the series over eight consecutive nights in January in one fell swoop. The Museum of Broadcast Communications recounts the apprehensions that Roots would flop, and how this made ABC prepare the format:

Musical score and soundtrack

The film score was composed, arranged and conducted by Quincy Jones, and the soundtrack album was released on the A&M label in 1977.

AllMusic's Richard S. Ginell said "Quincy Jones has been threatening to write a long tone poem sketching the history of black music for decades now, and he has yet to do it. This project, rushed out in the wake of the 1977 TV miniseries Roots, is about as close as he has come. A brief (28 minutes) immaculately produced and segued suite, Roots quickly traces a timeline from Africa to the Civil War, incorporating ancient and modern African influences (with Letta Mbulu as the featured vocalist), a sea shanty, field hollers and fiddle tunes, snippets of dialogue from Roots actor Lou Gossett, and some Hollywood-style movie cues. ... Though some prominent jazzers turn up in the orchestra, there is not a trace of jazz to be heard. This is a timely souvenir of a cultural phenomenon, but merely a curiosity for jazz fans".

Track listing
All compositions by Quincy Jones except where noted.
 "Motherland" − 0:29	
 "Roots Mural Theme" (Gerald Fried) − 2:12
 "Main Title: Mama Aifambeni" (Quincy Jones, Caiphus Semenya) − 0:59	
 "Behold the Only Thing Greater Than Yourself (Birth)" (Jones, Semenya) − 1:30
 "Oluwa (Many Rains Ago)" (Jones, Semenya) − 2:28
 "Boyhood to Manhood" (Jones, Zak Diouf, Bill Summers) − 0:55
 "The Toubob Is Here! (The Capture)" − 1:01
 "Middle Passage (Slaveship Crossing)" − 1:15
 "You in Americuh Now, African" − 0:33
 "Roots Mural Theme Intro (Slave Auction)" (Fried) − 0:16	
 "Ole Fiddler" (Lou Gossett Jr.) − 1:12
 "Jumpin' de Broom (Marriage Ceremony)" (Jones, Bobby Bruce) − 0:42
 "What Can I Do? (Hush, Hush, Somebody's Calling My Name)" (Jones, James Cleveland) − 2:16
 "Roots Mural Theme Bridge (Plantation Life)" (Fried) − 1:00
 "Oh Lord, Come By Here" (Jones, Cleveland) − 3:36	
 "Ole Fiddler/Free at Last? (The Civil War)" (Gosset/Jones) − 2:24
 "Many Rains Ago (Oluwa) [African Theme/English Version]" (Jones, Semenya) − 4:53

Personnel
Conceived, produced, arranged and conducted by Quincy Jones
Bobby Bryant, Buddy Childers, John Audino − trumpet
Bill Watrous, Dick Nash, Maurice Spear − trombone
Alan Robinson, David Duke, James Decker − French horn
Tommy Johnson − tuba
Ernie Watts, Jerome Richardson, Ted Nash, Terry Harrington, Bill Green − woodwinds
Dave Grusin, Ian Underwood, Mike Boddicker, Pete Jolly, Richard Tee − keyboards
David T. Walker, Lee Ritenour − guitar
Catherine Gotthoffer, Dorothy Remsen − harp
Alton Hendrickson − banjo
Chuck Rainey, Ed Reddick − electric bass
Arni Egillson, Milt Kestenbaum − bass
Bill Summers, Bobbye Hall, Caiphus Semenya, Emil Richards, King Errison, Milt Holland, Paul Bryant, Shelly Manne, Tommy Vig, Victor Feldman, Zak Diouf − percussion
Bobby Bruce − fiddle (track 12)
Bobby Bruce, Erno Neufeld, Gerald Vinci, Harry Bluestone, Irv Katz, Janice Gower, John Santulis, Joseph Livoti, Joe Stepansky, Ralph Shaeffer, Bob Sushell, Sheldon Sanov, Bill Nuttycomb − violin
Alex Nieman, Marilyn Baker, Bob Ostrowsky, Rollis Dale − viola
Jeff Solow, Jesse Erlich, Paul Bergstrom, Ronnie Cooper − cello
The Wattsline Choir conducted by Reverend James Cleveland – vocals (tracks 3, 5, 8, 13, 15 & 17) 
Charles May, David Pridgen, Mortonette Jenkins, Rodney Armstrong, Sherwood Sledge
Letta Mbulu − vocals (tracks 3–5 & 17)
Lou Gossett − vocals, dialogue (tracks 9, 11, & 16) 
Stan Haze − dialogue (track 10)
Zak Diouf − vocals (track 6)
Alex Hassilev − vocals (track 8)
Alexandra Brown, Caiphus Semenya, Deborah Tibbs, Jim Gilstrap, John Lehman, Linda Evans, Paulette McWilliams, Reverend James Cleveland, Stephanie Spruill – vocals
Bill Summers, Caiphus Semenya, Dave Grusin, Herb Spencer, John Mandel, Reverend James Cleveland, Dick Hazard, Tommy Bahler – arrangers
Tommy Bahler − choir arranger and conductor (tracks 5 & 17)

Charts and certifications

Reception
The series received positive reviews. Review aggregator website, Rotten Tomatoes later rated it 88% "fresh" based on 8 reviews. Variety reviewed it positively, summarizing, "The production and performances are strong, with newcomer LeVar Burton effective as the African youngster trapped into slavery. Edward Asner, as he did in Rich Man, Poor Man a year ago, dominates the screen in his opening scenes."

Legal issues
Following the success of the original novel and the miniseries, Haley was sued by author Harold Courlander, who asserted that Roots was plagiarized from his own novel The African, published nine years prior to Roots in 1967. The resulting trial ended with an out-of-court settlement and an admission from Haley that certain passages within Roots had been copied from Courlander's work. Separately, researchers refuted Haley's claims that, as the basis for Roots, Haley had traced his own ancestry back through slavery to a very specific individual and village in Africa.

After a five-week trial in federal district court, Courlander and Haley settled the case with a financial settlement and a statement that "Alex Haley acknowledges and regrets that various materials from The African by Harold Courlander found their way into his book, Roots." During the trial, presiding U.S. District Court Judge Robert J. Ward stated, "Copying there is, period." In a later interview with BBC Television, Judge Ward stated, "Alex Haley perpetrated a hoax on the public." During the trial, Alex Haley had maintained that he had not read The African before writing Roots. Shortly after the trial, however, a minority studies teacher at Skidmore College, Joseph Bruchac, came forward and swore in an affidavit that he had discussed The African with Haley in 1970 or 1971 and had given his own personal copy of The African to Haley, events that took place well before publication of Roots.

Historical accuracy

Broadcast history

Episode lists
Roots originally aired on ABC for eight consecutive nights from January 23 to 30, 1977. In the United Kingdom, BBC One aired the series in six parts, starting with parts 1 to 3 over the weekend of April 8 to 11, 1977. The concluding three parts were broadcast on Sunday nights, from April 15 to May 1. The six-part version screened by the BBC is the version released on home video.

U.S. television ratings
The miniseries was watched by an estimated 130 million and 140 million viewers total (more than half of the U.S. 1977 population of 221 million—the largest viewership ever attracted by any type of television series in US history as tallied by Nielsen Media Research) and averaged a 44.9 rating and 66% to 80% viewer share of the audience. The final episode was watched by 100 million viewers and an average of 80 million viewers watched each of the last seven episodes. Eighty-five percent of all television homes saw all or part of the miniseries. All episodes rank within the top-100-rated TV shows of all time.

On February 16–18, 2013, in honor of Black History Month and the 36th anniversary of Roots, cable network BET aired both Roots and its sequel miniseries, Roots: The Next Generations. Celebrating the 35th anniversary of Roots, BET premiered the miniseries on a three-day-weekend showing in December 2012, which resulted in its being seen by a total of 10.8 million viewers, according to Nielsen ratings, and became the number-one Roots telecast in cable-television history. As for the BET network, its 35th-anniversary airing of Roots became its best "non-tentpole" weekend in the network's history. On Sunday, October 18, 2015, TV One rebroadcast Roots in high definition.

Home media
Warner Home Video, which released a three-disc 25th-anniversary DVD edition of the series in 2002, released a four-disc (three double-sided, one single-sided) 30th-anniversary set on May 22, 2007. Bonus features include a new audio commentary by LeVar Burton, Cicely Tyson and Ed Asner, among other key cast members, "Remembering Roots" behind-the-scenes documentary, "Crossing Over: How Roots Captivated an Entire Nation" featurette, new interviews with key cast members and the DVD-ROM "Roots Family Tree" feature.

In 2016, Warner released the 40th-anniversary Blu-ray, which restored the program to its original eight-episode format and was completely remastered from the original elements. Along with that it carried over previous bonus material and added some new material.

The miniseries has also been released in the digital format for streaming. Though these versions have the edited six-episode format.

Awards and nominations

Accolades

Remake

The History channel produced a remake of the miniseries after acquiring rights from David L. Wolper's son, Mark Wolper, and Alex Haley's estate. The new eight-hour miniseries, with Mark Wolper as executive producer, drew on Haley's novel and the original miniseries albeit from a contemporary perspective. Lifetime and A&E also simulcast it. Will Packer, Marc Toberoff and Mark Wolper executive produced it, alongside Lawrence Konner and Mark Rosenthal. LeVar Burton and Korin Huggins co-executive produced it.

The four-night, eight-hour event series premiered on Memorial Day, May 30, 2016. The ensemble cast includes Forest Whitaker as Fiddler, Anna Paquin as Nancy Holt, Jonathan Rhys Meyers as Tom Lea, Anika Noni Rose as Kizzy, Tip "T.I." Harris as Cyrus, Emayatzy Corinealdi as Bell, Matthew Goode as Dr. William Waller, Mekhi Phifer as Jerusalem, James Purefoy as John Waller, introduces Regé-Jean Page as Chicken George and Malachi Kirby as Kunta Kinte, and Laurence Fishburne as Alex Haley.

See also
 Atlantic slave trade
 Middle Passage
 Triangular trade
 List of films featuring slavery
 Behold, 1990 statue
 Underground (TV series)
 The Underground Railroad (TV series)

References

External links
 
 
 Encyclopedia of Television 
 

 
1977 American television series debuts
1977 American television series endings
1970s American television miniseries
English-language television shows
African-American genealogy
Films based on American novels
Films about American slavery
Films set in the Gambia
Best Drama Series Golden Globe winners
Peabody Award-winning television programs
Primetime Emmy Award for Outstanding Miniseries winners
Television shows based on American novels
Television shows set in Virginia
Television shows set in New Orleans
American Broadcasting Company original programming
Television series set in the 18th century
Television series set in the 19th century
Television series set in the 1790s
Television series set in the 1800s
Television series set in the 1820s
Television series set in the 1840s
Television series set in the 1860s
Television series set in the 1870s
Television series by The Wolper Organization
Films scored by Gerald Fried
Films set in pre-colonial sub-Saharan Africa
Cockfighting in film